Skeletophyllon is a genus of moths in the family Cossidae.

Species
 Skeletophyllon andamani Yakovlev, 2011 
 Skeletophyllon dictyograpta (Roepke, 1957)
 Skeletophyllon euphyes (West, 1932)
 Skeletophyllon friedeli Yakovlev, 2006
 Skeletophyllon hanuman Yakovlev, 2011 
 Skeletophyllon kalinini Yakovlev, 2011
 Skeletophyllon kalisi (Roepke, 1957)
 Skeletophyllon kshatrij Yakovlev, 2011 
 Skeletophyllon pallida Yakovlev, 2011 
 Skeletophyllon perdrix (Roepke, 1955)
 Skeletophyllon puer Yakovlev, 2006
 Skeletophyllon sibolgae (Roepke, 1957)
 Skeletophyllon tarasovi Yakovlev, 2011
 Skeletophyllon tempestua (Lucas, 1898)
 Skeletophyllon wetarensis Yakovlev, 2011

References

 , 2004: Cossidae of Thailand. Part 1. (Lepidoptera: Cossidae). Atalanta 35 (3-4): 335-351.
 , 2006, New Cossidae (Lepidoptera) from Asia, Africa and Macronesia, Tinea 19 (3): 188-213.
 , 2011: Two new species of the goat moths (Lepidoptera, Cossidae) from New Guinea. Amurian zoological journal III(3): 284-286. Full article: .

External links
Natural History Museum Lepidoptera generic names catalog

Zeuzerinae